The Embassy of Belgium in London is Belgium's diplomatic mission to the United Kingdom. It is located at 17 Grosvenor Crescent, having moved from its historical location in Eaton Square in 2006.

The government of Flanders also maintains a representative office at 1a Cavendish Square, Marylebone and the Belgian Ambassador's Residence is located on Upper Belgrave Street, Belgravia.

The embassy building was designed by George Basevi in the 1860s. It is Grade II listed.

 Bruno van der Pluijm is the ambassador, replacing Rudolf Huygelen

Gallery

References

External links

Official site

Belgium
London
Belgium–United Kingdom relations
Belgium
Belgravia
Grade II listed buildings in the City of Westminster